Kenneth Earl Holliday (born June 25, 1949) is an American actor of stage, film, and television. He is known for his role as Ben Matlock's original private investigator, Tyler Hudson, on Matlock, and as Sgt. Curtis Baker on Carter Country from 1977 until 1979. He was nominated for the Independent Spirit Award for Best Supporting Male for his performance in the film Great World of Sound.

Biography
Holliday, a product of the Copiague area of Long Island, New York, was raised in a Christian home, born into a Baptist family. At age 12, he lost his father. With the encouragement of his mother, he participated in track at Copiague High School where he was part of the Fantastic Four Relay Team and was the star of his football team. He was nicknamed as Mr. Hotshot and was known as a "scoring machine" on and off the football field. He graduated in 1967 and attended University of Maryland on a full scholarship. As he recalled, times were turbulent,. and the football team was preparing to go on strike against the NCAA over a change in coaches.

He was "jazzed" by a class he took related to the history of theater and acting became his new passion. In 1969, as an undergraduate he played Yank in The Hairy Ape by Eugene O'Neill. He was the first black person to perform in a leading role on the college's "main stage."

After graduation from college his first work was with the Inaugural Theater Group at the Folger Shakespeare Library in Washington, D.C. There, he conducted workshops as a founding member of the D.C. Black Repertory Company. In 1975, he was fired from his job because of his continued problems with drugs and alcohol. His chemical abuse continued for the next 14 years. However, despite those problems he starred in the role of Carlyle in David Rabe's Vietnam War–era play Streamers at the Lincoln Theatre.

That play led him to Los Angeles in 1976 where he guest-starred on several shows such as Kojak; What's Happening!!; The Incredible Hulk; Quincy, M.E.; Lou Grant; Soap and its spin-off series, Benson; The Jeffersons; The Fall Guy; Hart to Hart and Doogie Howser, M.D. He guest starred on many other shows. His first "featuring" television series was Carter Country where he co-starred with Victor French as Sgt. Curtis Baker from 1977 until 1979. He also was featured in Roots: The Next Generations and starred in a series of pilots which failed to make it to the air as regular series. Kene provided the voice of the character Roadblock in the 1980s cartoon series, G.I. Joe and 1987's G.I. Joe: The Movie. In 1985, he appeared in the TV film Badge of the Assassin.

In early 1986, while providing the voice of Roadblock, he received a phone call from producers Fred Silverman and Dean Hargrove. He was their first choice to play Matlock's private investigator Tyler Hudson on the Matlock series opposite TV veteran Andy Griffith. Holliday said in a 2012 interview with Blake Radio that when he was 11 years old he occasionally watched The Andy Griffith Show; he had recognized all the characters from his mentor's show and won the Matlock role. He was eventually fired from the series due to ongoing concerns around his substance abuse.

Other TV work and personal life

He has numerous television and movie appearances to his credit, including roles in G.I. Joe: The Movie (1987), CBS’s made-for-television movie Miracle On The Mountain (2000), Hope & Faith (2004), and Law & Order: Special Victims Unit (2005).

He published a book of poetry in 1998 entitled The Book of K-III: The Contemporary Poetics of Kene Holliday.

Holliday became a traveling evangelist, and he and his wife spent the next decade preaching in gospel musicals.

In 2002, Holliday became the round-the-clock caregiver for his mother, who suffers from Alzheimer's disease and subsequently became a member of the Alzheimer's Foundation of America.

While taking care of his mother, he accepted the lead role in the movie Great World of Sound in 2007.

Filmography
{| class="wikitable sortable"
|-
! Year
! Title
! Role
! Notes
|-    
| 1976
| Kojak 
| Assistant D.A. Dunn
| Episode: "A Shield For Murder" (parts 1 and 2)
|-
| 1977–79
| Carter Country
| Sergeant Curtis Baker
| 44 episodes
|-
| 1978
| Incredible Hulk
| Paul
| Episode: "Earthquakes Happen"
|-
| 1978
| Battle of the Network Stars
| Himself
| Episode: "Battle of the Network Stars IV"
|-
| 1978
| What's Happening!!'
| The Gong Show Judge Himself
| Episode: "Going, Going, Gong"
|-
| 1979
| Quincy M.E.| Father Tony Hamilton
| Episode: "Never a Child"
|-
| 1979
| Roots: The Next Generations| Detroit
| MiniseriesPart III
|-
| 1980
| Soap| Eddie Dawson
| Episode 60
|-
| 1980
| Benson| Jake
| Episode: "Takin' It to the Streets"
|-
| 1981
| See China and Die| Sgt. Alvin Sykes
| Television film
|-
| 1982 
| Hart To Hart| William Dean
| Episode: "Hart and Sole" as William Dean
|-
| 1982
| Chicago Story| Dr. Jeff House
| 
|-
| 1984
| Benson| Earl (Benson's brother)
| episode "the reunion"
|-
| 1984
| The Philadelphia Experiment| Major Clark
|
|-
| 1984
| No Small Affair| Walt Cronin
|
|-
| 1985
| Badge of the Assassin| Albert Washington
| Television film
|-
| 1985–86
| G.I. Joe: A Real American Hero| Roadblock (voice)
| 36 episodes
|-
| 1986
| Diary Of A Perfect Murder| Tyler Hudson
| Television film
|-
| 1986
| The Fall Guy| Lt. Joe Budd
| Episode: "In His Shadow"
|-
| 1986–90
| Matlock| Tyler Hudson
| seasons 1–3; appeared in episode 4 & 14 in season 4
|-
| 1987
| G.I. Joe: The Movie| Roadblock (voice)
| 
|-
| 1987
| If It's Tuesday, It Still Must Be Belgium| Bon Sperling
| Television film
|-
| 1990
| Perry Mason: Case of the Silenced Singer| Joe Dillon
| 
|-
| 1991
| The Josephine Baker Story| Sidney Bechet
| Television film
|-
| 1991
| Doogie Howser, M.D.| Raymond's Old Mentor
| Episode: "Truth and Consequences"
|-
| 1992
| Jake and The Fatman| Montgomery Dubois
| Episode: "Ain't Misbehavin'"
|-
| 1996: 
| Diagnosis Murder| Burke's Producer
| Episode: "FMurder"
|-
| 2005
| Law & Order: Special Victims Unit| Coach Veneziano
| Episode: "Ripped"
|-
| 2007
| Great World of Sound| Clarence
|
|-
| 2008
| Law & Order: Criminal Intent| Cold Case Detective
| Episode: "Last Rites"
|-
| 2009 
| Grand Theft Auto: Episodes from Liberty City| Theodore the Saxophone Player
| Videogame
|}

Accolades
Gotham Awards
2008: Breakthrough Actor: Great World of Sound (Nominated)
Independent Spirit Award
2008: Best Supporting Male: Great World of Sound'' (Nominated)

References

External links

1949 births
20th-century American male actors
21st-century American male actors
African-American male actors
American evangelicals
American male film actors
American male television actors
American male voice actors
Living people
Maryland Terrapins football players
People from Copiague, New York
20th-century African-American people
21st-century African-American people